Albert Yagüe Jiménez (born 27 March 1985) is a Spanish former footballer who played as a forward.

Club career
Born in Vilassar de Mar, Barcelona, Catalonia, Yagüe was a product of RCD Espanyol's youth system and made his only La Liga appearance on 18 September 2005, playing one minute in a 1–0 home win against Real Madrid after having come on as a substitute for Iván de la Peña. In January 2007, he joined Lorca Deportiva CF in the Segunda División on loan until 30 June.

In the summer of 2007, Yagüe was released by Espanyol and signed for another club in the second tier, SD Eibar, scoring four goals in his debut season. After missing a good part of the 2008–09 campaign due to injury, he moved to UD Melilla of Segunda División B in July 2009, as the Basques had also been relegated.

References

External links

1985 births
Living people
People from Vilassar de Mar
Sportspeople from the Province of Barcelona
Spanish footballers
Footballers from Catalonia
Association football forwards
La Liga players
Segunda División players
Segunda División B players
Tercera División players
Divisiones Regionales de Fútbol players
RCD Espanyol B footballers
RCD Espanyol footballers
Lorca Deportiva CF footballers
SD Eibar footballers
UD Melilla footballers
Cultural Leonesa footballers
CD Atlético Baleares footballers
CF Badalona players
CD Castellón footballers
UE Sant Andreu footballers
CF Torre Levante players
Erovnuli Liga players
FC Dinamo Tbilisi players
Spanish expatriate footballers
Expatriate footballers in Georgia (country)
Spanish expatriate sportspeople in Georgia (country)